The 2002–03 Slovak First Football League was the tenth season of first-tier football league in Slovakia, since its establishment in 1993. This season started on 12 July 2002 and ended on 17 June 2003. MŠK Žilina are the defending champions.

Teams
A total of 10 teams was contested in the league, including 9 sides from the 2001–02 season and one promoted from the 2. Liga.

Relegation for 1. FC Tatran Prešov to the 2002–03 2. Liga was confirmed on 8 June 2002. The one relegated team were replaced by FC Spartak Trnava.

Stadiums and locations

League table

Results

First half of season

Second half of season

Season statistics

Top scorers

Awards

Top Eleven

Goalkeeper:  Tomáš Bernady (Púchov)
Defence:   Radoslav Zabavník,  Branislav Labant (all Žilina),  Peter Dzúrik (Slovan),  Vladimír Kinder (Artmedia)
Midfield:  Marek Mintál,  Zdeno Štrba,  Martin Ďurica (all Žilina),  Mário Breška (Púchov)
Attack:  Róbert Vittek (Slovan),  Martin Fabuš (Trenčín/Žilina)

See also
2002–03 Slovak Cup
2002–03 2. Liga (Slovakia)

References

External links
RSSSF.org (Tables and statistics)

Slovak Super Liga seasons
1
Slovak